Musa siamensis is an Asian tropical species of plant in the banana family native to Indo-China (Thailand).

References

siamensis
Plants described in 2007
Flora of Thailand